American Esperantist may refer to:
Amerika Esperantisto, defunct 20th century Esperanto periodical
Usona Esperantisto, bi-monthly periodical of Esperanto-USA